Gorilla Ship is a 1932 American Pre-Code drama film directed by Frank Strayer from an original screenplay by George Waggner. Starring Ralph Ince, Vera Reynolds, and Reed Howes, the film was produced by Ralph M. Like, Ltd. and distributed by Mayfair Pictures. It was released on June 11, 1932.

Cast list
 Ralph Ince as Captain "Gorilla" Larson
 Vera Reynolds as Helen Wells
 Reed Howes as Dave Burton
 Wheeler Oakman as Philip Wells
 James Bradbury Jr. as Dumb sailor
 Erin La Brissoniere as Girl friend
 George Chesebro as Smith, the first mate
 Ben Hall as Benny, the cabin boy

References

External links

1932 films
1932 drama films
American drama films
Films directed by Frank R. Strayer
American black-and-white films
Mayfair Pictures films
1930s English-language films
1930s American films